The Two Waters is a 1988 Argentine drama film directed by Carlos Olguin-Trelawny, his opera prima, and written  Martha Gavensky starring Miguel Ángel Solá and Bárbara Mújica.

Plot
In Buenos Aires on Christmas Eve 1983, Rey (Miguel Ángel Solá) and Isabel (Bárbara Mujica), two old college friends, bump into each other at a restaurant. It has been fifteen years since they last saw each other. Isabel has just returned from exile; Rey had just wanted to be alone, wrestling with his own personal demons.

This by-chance encounter with Isabel takes Rey back to his college days when he was secretly in love with her. "A dos aguas" (The Entire Life) is a look at the effects of years spent living under a brutal dictatorship and peoples' desperate rush to recover lost time. Perhaps more importantly, it depicts the pain of being an orphan in both a physical and spiritual sense.

Release
Praised by critics as the first post-modern Latin American film. 
"A dos aguas" premiered on April 28, 1988 in Argentina and in various European countries most notably France in October 1988.

"A dos aguas" was produced by Avica Producciones and Jorge Estrada Mora Producciones (JEMPSA) and distributed worldwide by Metropolis Films (Zürich, CH).

Reception
Director Carlos Olguin-Trelawny won a Special Mention at the 40th Locarno International Film Festival of 1987.

Cast
 Miguel Ángel Solá as Rey
 Bárbara Mujica as Isabel
 Sandra Ballesteros as "La mujer felina"
 Rubén Ballester
 Jorge Baza de Candia
 Aldo Braga as "Patricio/Weintraub"
 Mónica Lacoste
 Cipe Lincovsky as "María"
 Miguel Ruiz Díaz
 Jorge Sassi as "Rey's Alter ego"
 Osvaldo Tesser as "Rey's father"
 Antonio Ugo as "Bartender"

External links
 

1988 films
1988 drama films
1980s Spanish-language films
Argentine drama films
1980s Argentine films